Kyivstar is a Ukrainian telecommunications company, providing communication services and data transmission based on a broad range of fixed and mobile technologies, including  4G (LTE) in Ukraine. 

The Kyivstar mobile network covers all cities of Ukraine, as well as more than 28,000 rural settlements, all major national and regional routes, most sea, and river coasts. As of 2020, Kyivstar became the largest mobile operator and one of the largest broadband Internet providers in Ukraine, serving about 26 million mobile customers and more than 1 million broadband fixed internet customers in Ukraine (Home Internet"). The company owns five network codes: 67, 68, 96, 97 and 98.

Together with the main telecom services, Kyivstar provides FMC services (convergence of mobile and fixed communications), digital solutions - Big Data, industrial IoT, Clouds, mobile financial services, Open API "Kyivstar Open Telecom" and others. The company implements these products both independently and in partnership with large IT companies, including Microsoft.

Kyivstar is also one of the leaders in the OTT TV segment, providing access to more than 250 TV channels.

Kyivstar has built the largest communication infrastructure in Ukraine - more than 48 thousand base stations. The company uses its fiber-optic network with a total length of 44,000 km and a bandwidth of over 380 Gbps.

PJSC Kyivstar was founded and registered in Ukraine in 1994 and has been providing mobile services since 1997. The company's head office is located in Kyiv. Kyivstar is a part of the international telecom group VEON. VEON Ltd is a European Union Netherlands-headquartered, NASDAQ, and EURONEXT-listed company with an investor base including thousands of shareholders in the US and Europe and worldwide. VEON does not have, and never have had, a majority or controlling shareholder. 

Since 2006, Kyivstar has been implementing social responsibility projects.

Following the results of 2016, Kyivstar became one of 29 Ukrainian companies, which, according to the American consulting group Deloitte, were ranked among the 500 largest companies in Central and Eastern Europe.

In 2020, Kyivstar became the most expensive brand in Ukraine according to a Correspondent magazine, and the best employer in Ukraine in the TOP-100 rating. It was also rated the largest Company of the Year in mobile communication. According to the results of 2020 and 2021 Kyivstar is the largest taxpayer among the companies in the field of communications and information.

In its activities, the company adheres to the latest technologies.

Alexander Komarov has been the President of the company since December 2018.

Tariffs 
As of March 2022, the company has tariffs for two groups of subscribers - prepaid and contract.

Tariffs for prepaid subscribers range from UAH 125/4 weeks ("Smachnyy”, eng. - “Delicious”) to UAH 250/4 weeks ("Tviy Optimum", eng. - “Your Optimum”)

For contract users, tariffs range from UAH 135 / month (“Vash Start”, eng. - "Your Start") to UAH 1,500 / month ("Vash Maximum", eng. - “Your maximum”).

There are special rates for the elderly and people with disabilities - “Dzvinky dlia batkiv” (eng. - "Calls for parents") and “Internet dlia batkiv” (eng. - "Internet for parents").

Main indicators

Coverage 
As of 2021, it is the largest mobile operator, serving about 26,2 million mobile customers and more than 1,2 million fixed broadband customers in Ukraine. In 2021, Kyivstar continued to build 4G networks throughout Ukraine and provided 90.3% of the population has access to 4G services. In particular, the operator implemented a program to cover high-speed mobile Internet of all highways of international importance.

At the beginning of 2022:

 90.3% of the population has access to 4G services;
 Consumption of data traffic per subscriber increased to 7.1 GB (Q4 2021);
 The number of Kyivstar TV subscribers in Q4 2021 increased by 59.6% compared to 2020. Today, the service is used by 691,000 subscribers from all over Ukraine.

Kyivstar provides GSM communication services throughout its coverage and roaming in 189 countries on 5 continents. 

In the first half of 2021, the operator became the leader in mobile Internet speed for the third time, according to Ookla research. With the start of 4G implementation, the average data download speed in the Kyivstar network has almost doubled, from 17.9 Mbps in 2018 to 33.2 Mbps in the first half of 2021, which is the highest among mobile operators in Ukraine.

Financial indicators 
According to the company, in 2021:

 Kyivstar's total revenue amounted to UAH 28,748 billion.
 The main profit of the company brought mobile services - UAH 26,712 billion (an increase of 12,3%). Including mobile internet services UAH 19,092 billion (up 18%)
 Revenue from fixed communications - UAH 18.59 billion. (growth of 16%).
 The volume of the company's capital investments excluding leases and licenses for the year amounted to UAH 4,851 billion.
 The number of mobile subscribers is about 26,2 million
 The number of fixed-line subscribers - is 1.2 million.
 The amount of taxes and payments paid to the budget of Ukraine for 2021 amounted to more than UAH 10,2 billion, and once again became the largest taxpayer to the state among telecom operators in Ukraine.
 During the year, the company invested UAH 5,5 billion in infrastructure development.

Number capacity 
Kyivstar uses five network codes - 67, 68, 96, 97, 98, and also has number capacities in the fixed telephone network of many cities of Ukraine (for example, 2000 numbers with indexes 695ххх, 696ххх in Poltava, 20,000 numbers with indexes 781хххх, 782хххх in Odesa, till July 2014 - 5000 numbers with indexes 905ххх - 909ххх in Sevastopol.

History

The 1990s and 2000s 
The company was founded in 1994 by Igor Litovchenko under the name "Bridge". Subsequently, the name was changed to Kyivstar.

1997 - Launch of the mobile network. The company started providing mobile services on December 9, 1997.

1998 - The first in Ukraine to provide SMS services.

2000 - The first in Ukraine to provide access to mobile Internet using WAP technology. That year, free incoming calls within the network were introduced for all subscribers (for the first time on the market). Internet access services (including WAP) were introduced. The company became the first GSM-banking operator (StarCard). Subscribers are provided with an inter-standard roaming service.

2001 - Kyivstar became the leader of the telecom market of Ukraine by the number of subscribers.

2002 - GPRS data transmission services started. Kyivstar became the first mobile operator in Ukraine to provide roaming services in all European countries. The company was certified according to the international quality system ISO 9001: 2000.

In the fall of 2003, the charge for incoming calls was abolished. Kyivstar won the EuroMarket International Award of the European Market Research Center (EMRC), and the Ukrainian Investment Newspaper recognized Kyivstar as the most dynamic company in Ukraine in the TOP-100 rating.

In 2004, Kyivstar demonstrated EDGE data transmission technology for the first time in Ukraine, became the official mobile operator of the National Olympic Team of Ukraine, and the issue of Kyivstar GSM corporate bonds was recognized as the best financial transaction of the year in emerging international markets.

The 2010s 
On October 21, 2010, the process of integration of Ukrainian telecommunications operators Kyivstar and Beeline-Ukraine (CJSC Ukrainian Radio Systems and Golden Telecom) into one company began. The combined company provided telecommunications services under the Kyivstar, djuice, Kyivstar-Business, and Beeline brands. According to Kyivstar, the process of merging operators was completed by the end of 2012.

In 2013, the provision of mobile financial services was launched, in particular the Mobile Money service, which allows subscribers to top up bank cards and pay for goods and services of various companies from mobile phones. In the ranking of the 500 largest companies in Central and Eastern Europe compiled by Deloitte, Kyivstar took 146th place, the highest among Ukrainian mobile operators.

On August 11, 2014, Kyivstar stopped serving its subscribers in Crimea due to an armed attack on the company's office in Simferopol.

In February 2015, Kyivstar announced the termination of telecom services in the temporarily occupied territories of the Donetsk and Luhansk regions.

On February 23, 2015, Kyivstar purchased a license to provide services in the UMTS standard, which belongs to the third generation of mobile communications (3G). Under the terms of the tender, the operator undertook to launch a third-generation network within 18 months after the tender in all regional centers of Ukraine, and 6 years in all district centers and all settlements with a population of over 10 thousand people.

In April 2015, Kyivstar started providing 3G services.

In June 2015, the company rebranded, introducing changes in the company's corporate style and values, which now correspond to the new slogan of the operator: "Simple. Innovative. Better".

November 14, 2016, was the 20th anniversary of the opening of the listing on the US Stock Exchange,  one of the most important milestones in the history of the international group of companies VEON, which includes the national telecommunications operator Kyivstar. On the same day, Kyivstar was the first in Ukraine to launch tariffs that combine mobile, home Internet, and TV services in one offer - Kyivstar All Together.

On March 23, 2017, Kyivstar initiated the reform of radio frequencies in the 1800 MHz band to provide all participants in the telecom market with equal opportunities to develop 4G communication.

On April 25, 2017, Kyivstar announced the readiness of the network equipment to provide 4G communication services. To modernize the network, the company installed equipment based on the Single RAN solution (single radio access). This solution allows the use of equipment for various mobile communication standards, including 3G and 4G, within a single software and hardware complex of the base station.

On November 29, 2017, the National Bank of Ukraine granted the subsidiary Kyivstar (StarMoney LLC) the status of payment infrastructure operator.

On December 26, 2017, Kyivstar and the Ministry of Economic Development and Trade of Ukraine signed a Memorandum of Cooperation. Under the terms of the Memorandum, the parties agreed to exchange statistical information to determine the number of domestic and foreign tourists moving through the territory of Ukraine. The obtained data are used by the Ministry for the development of the tourism industry and the promotion of Ukraine in foreign and domestic tourism markets.

On December 27, 2017, Kyivstar started connecting subscribers to the Mobile-ID service, which provides the possibility of electronic identification to receive electronic services.

At the end of January 2018, Kyivstar was included in the list of large companies that provide more than 70% of all revenues to the state budget of Ukraine.

On January 31, 2018, Kyivstar received a 4G (LTE) license for the frequency of 2600 MHz.

On March 6, 2018, the next auction of licenses for frequencies in the 1800 MHz band took place. According to its results, Kyivstar acquired the most frequencies in this range for UAH 1 billion 512 million.

On April 6, 2018, Kyivstar launched 4G communication in the 2600 MHz band in 20 cities of Ukraine.

On April 12, 2018, Kyivstar received 4G licenses in the 1800 MHz band.

On July 1, 2018, Kyivstar started providing 4G services in the 1800 MHz band.

On December 20, 2018, Kyivstar launched the Mobile-ID service for the whole of Ukraine.

On July 11, 2019, Kyivstar announced its readiness to voluntarily transfer to the state part of the radio frequency band in the 900 MHz band so that other mobile operators that lack frequencies could receive them through a tender.

On September 17, 2019, Kyivstar and Microsoft announced the launch of a joint cloud solution Azure Stack with Kyivstar in Ukraine. Azure Stack cloud solution allows you to implement Azure services in a local data center, creating conditions for the development of business innovation in Ukraine.

On December 17, 2019, Kyivstar was the first on the Ukrainian market to present a technical solution for creating remote jobs.

The 2020s 
On January 15, 2020, the Ministry of Digital Transformation of Ukraine and Kyivstar began cooperation in the field of digital literacy.

On March 5, 2020, Kyivstar together with two operators started providing 4G communication services using frequencies in the 1800 MHz band at the Akademmistechko metro station in Kyiv and in the tunnel to the Zhytomyrska station. As of July 3, 2020, high-speed Internet services have been expanded, using frequencies in the 1800 MHz and 2600 MHz bands, at eight more Kyiv metro stations and in tunnels between them. These are the stations Zhytomyrska, Sviatoshyn, Heroiv Dnipra, Minska, Obolon, Syrets, Dorohozhychy and Lukyanivska. Starting in May 2021, Kyivstar's high-speed 4G Internet will be available at all Kyiv metro stations.

On March 18, 2020, Kyivstar received a license to develop 4G communication in the 900 MHz band for the development of high-speed mobile Internet in the most remote settlements of Ukraine.

In November 2020, Kyivstar and other mobile operators in Ukraine reformed 900 MHz radio frequencies. This allowed the development of high-speed mobile Internet in small towns and rural areas.

2022. Kyivstar during the Russian-Ukrainian war 
From February 24, 2022, from the beginning of a new stage of Russian military aggression against Ukraine, Kyivstar implemented a package of measures to support society and subscribers. The company provided customers with free communication services, allocated UAH 15 million for charity and paid more than UAH 1 billion in taxes ahead of schedule. 

For prepaid subscribers:

 Calls within the network for 21.5 million subscribers work with zero on the account and without paid tariff.
 Subscribers can use the Extra money service for ordering additional funds to account with no commission. 

For contract subscribers and business clients:

 Kyivstar has increased credit limits so that customers can use basic services without topping up their accounts.
 For business customers with fixed services (internet, telephony and data transmission), the payment deadlines for their bills are delayed by 30 days.
 Kyivstar provided Star.Docs electronic document management service free of charge to businesses and government organizations.

For subscribers in roaming:

 Kyivstar provided an extra UAH 250 as a bonus for calls and mobile internet abroad. Bonuses are awarded to all subscribers who are forced to leave for one of 9 European countries: Poland, Romania, Hungary, Slovakia, Moldova, Germany, Italy, Lithuania, or the Czech Republic. Over 1.4 million subscribers have already received these bonuses in the first 2 weeks.

For Home Internet and Kyivstar TV customers: 

 The company provided the opportunity to use fixed Internet at speeds up to 80 Mbps to subscribers without the possibility of paying a bill. 
 Kyivstar provided free Wi-Fi in more than 200 bomb shelters throughout Ukraine.  
 The company opened access to most of the content on the Kyivstar TV online television platform. Also, subscribers of other mobile operators have free access to news channels and children's content.

Kyivstar actively supports the state and Ukrainian society, the Armed Forces of Ukraine:

 The company transferred UAH 1.1 billion of income tax to the state budget ahead of schedule.
 The company allocated ₴10 million of charitable assistance for the Come Back Alive charity fund and 5 million for the “Your support” (Ukr - “Твоя опора”).
 The company has created a platform to raise funds for the needs of the Ukrainian army. With the short number 88009, Kyivstar subscribers collected more than UAH 1.2 million in the first two weeks of the platform's existence.

Kyivstar, in cooperation with the State Emergency Service of Ukraine, sent out more than 150 million SMS messages with vital information, in particular, about actions during an air raid alert, first aid, etc.

In the first quarter of 2022, Kyivstar invested UAH 659 million in communication development. And thanks to the round-the-clock work of the company's specialists, 95% of the base stations of the telecom network work in normal mode. During the war, the company built more than 100 new mobile communication facilities and connected 1,150 bomb shelters in various cities of Ukraine to the free Internet. 

Kyivstar, together with other mobile operators, the Ministry of Digital Transformation of Ukraine, the State Service for Special Communications and Information Protection of Ukraine, the National Commission for State Regulation in the Fields of Electronic Communications, Radio Frequency Spectrum and Postal Services, together with the Ukrainian Association of Telecom Operators "Telas", launched national roaming.

CSR 
By its corporate social responsibility strategy, Kyivstar implements social responsibility projects in five areas: digital inclusion, development of innovative entrepreneurship, Internet security, corporate volunteering, and partnership for sustainable development. The company supports the UN Sustainable Development Goals and focuses on goals 4 (quality education), 8 (decent work and economic growth), 9 (innovation and infrastructure), and 17 (partnership for sustainable development).

In 2015, Kyivstar initiated the social and educational program Make Your Mark to support talented schoolchildren, programmers, startups, and young entrepreneurs. The initiative provides support to Ukrainian students who show the best results in the exact disciplines: science, technology, including information, engineering, robotics, and mathematics.

On August 8, 2017, Kyivstar started providing its subscribers with non-tariffed access to the Prometheus application, a platform for open online courses that offers a free selection of educational programs from the best Ukrainian and foreign teachers.

On November 30, 2017, Kyivstar launched the Sharity social platform to help charitable projects. As part of this initiative, the operator transferred UAH 1.6 million to the Tvoya Opora Charitable Foundation to provide medicines for children's heart surgeries.

Since 2017, Kyivstar has been supporting the GoCamp educational project in cooperation with the largest international volunteer initiative in Eastern Europe, GoGlobal. As part of the project, Ukrainian students learn foreign languages and communicate in a multicultural environment. Kyivstar initiated the development of an interactive training course Entrepreneurship & Innovation development. The company's specialists, as volunteers and mentors, organize training webinars for students and teachers.

On August 15, 2018, in Kharkiv, Kyiv, and Poltava regions, Kyivstar and the National Police of Ukraine launched the joint project "Search for Children". By the end of 2018, Kyivstar connected all regions of Ukraine to the service.

At the end of 2018, Kyivstar together with the International Charitable Foundation "Ukrainian Charity Exchange" launched the "Children's Hope" initiative to help children with heart disease and cancer. Kyivstar has created a transparent system that allows its subscribers to make charitable contributions quickly and conveniently via SMS. In 2021, the fee for the project exceeded ₴8 million. These funds were used to purchase equipment for more than 15 hospitals throughout Ukraine.

In September 2019, the operator launched Ukraine's first online mobile literacy school "Smartphone for parents" - an interactive video course for the older generation with step-by-step instructions, as well as an information campaign to bridge the digital divide and break stereotypes about technology. In December 2020, this project won the European Excellence Awards in the Telecommunications category, and also won bronze in the national competition Effie Awards Ukraine in the PR category, Corporate Reputation.

On February 11, 2020, together with the Ministry of Digital Transformation of Ukraine and the Office of the Presidential Commissioner for Children's Rights, Kyivstar launched an educational portal https://stop-sexting.in.ua and an information campaign #не_ведись.

In connection with the coronavirus pandemic in 2020, Kyivstar has allocated UAH 30 million, of which UAH 30 million is charitable. In cooperation with the Tvoya Opora Charitable Foundation, the company provided Ukrainian hospitals with 10 ventilators with consumables, 20 patient monitors, and 6,851 reusable protective suits for medical staff at 30 support hospitals and 55 oxygen concentrators.

References

External links
 
  
 

Telenor
Ukrainian companies established in 1994
Telecommunications companies established in 1994
Mobile phone companies of Ukraine
Ukrainian brands
Companies based in Kyiv
VEON